A boot is a type of footwear.

Boot(s) may also refer to:

Businesses 
 Boot Inn, Chester, Cheshire, England
 Boots (company), a high-street pharmacy chain and manufacturer of pharmaceuticals in the United Kingdom
 The Boot, Cromer Street, a pub in King's Cross, London

Places 
 Boot, Cumbria, a small village in Eskdale, Cumbria, England
 Boot Key, an island in the Florida Keys
 Boot Lake (Nova Scotia), Canada
 Boot Pond (Plymouth, Massachusetts)
 Boot Rock, South Sandwich Islands
 Boots Creek (Manitoba), Canada
 "The Boot", an informal name for Italy, due to the country's shape

People with the name 
 Boot (surname), a list of people surnamed either Boot or Boots
 Boots (nickname), a list of people with the nickname
 Boots (musician), an American record producer
 Boots Riley, American rapper, lead vocalist of The Coup and Street Sweeper Social Club
 Gypsy Boots (1914–2004), also known as Boots Bootzin, American fitness pioneer, actor and writer born Robert Bootzin
 Little Boots, English electropop singer-songwriter and DJ

Arts, entertainment, and media

Fictional characters 
 Boot, an Old English Sheepdog in The Perishers, a British cartoon strip
 Terry Boot, a member of Dumbledore's Army in the Harry Potter series
 William Boot, the fictional protagonist of the Evelyn Waugh novel Scoop
 Boots, a tiger who sang and played guitar in the ITV children's series Animal Kwackers
 Boots, the title character of the American comic strip Boots and Her Buddies, shortened by some newspapers as Boots
 Boots, the hero of the Norwegian fairy tale "Boots and the Troll"
 Boots, a monkey on the television series Dora the Explorer
 Boots Malone, the title character of the film Boots Malone
 Melvin "Boots" O'Neal, a main character in the Bruno and Boots children's novel series

Films 
 Boots (film), a 1919 American silent film starring Dorothy Gish and Richard Barthelmess
 Das Boot ("The Boat"), a 1981 German movie by Wolfgang Petersen based on the Lothar-Günther Buchheim novel of the same name

Music

Labels
 Boot Records, a former Canadian country, bluegrass and contemporary folk label formed in 1971

Albums and EPs
 Boots (album), a 1966 album by Nancy Sinatra
 "Boots" (EP), a 2002 EP by industrial music band KMFDM with a cover of the Nancy Sinatra song
 Boot!, a 2013 album by The Thing
 Boots, a 2002 album by Noe Venable

Songs
 "Boots" (The Killers song), a 2010 song by The Killers
 "Boots", a 1928 song composed by Peter Dawson aka "J.P. McCall"
 "Boots", a song by Mighty Gabby
 "Boots", a song by Hardy from his 2020 album A Rock
"Boot" (ブート Būto), a song by Macintosh Plus from Floral Shoppe
 "Das Boot" (song), title theme of the film of the same name

Other uses in arts, entertainment, and media
 Boot (magazine), an American computer magazine now known as Maximum PC
 "Boots" (poem), by Rudyard Kipling (1903)
 "Boots", an episode of the television series Teletubbies
 Bootleg recording, unauthorized audio or video recording, often abbreviated to "boot"
 The Boot (website), a music blog owned by Townsquare Media

Computing 
 Boot (software), a Clojure build automation tool
 /boot/ directory, a protected Unix directory used in the boot process
 Booting, the initial set of operations that a computer system performs when turned on
 Ping-Pong virus, alternatively called "boot"

Roles or professions
 Boot, a recruit undergoing recruit training in the United States Marine Corps or Navy, or an inexperienced marine or sailor
 Boot or boots, a servant who acts as a shoeshiner, especially in a hotel

Transportation 
 Boot (car), the storage compartment of a car
 Boot, a built-in compartment on a horse-drawn coach, used originally as a seat for the coachman and later for storage
 Deicing boot, a device installed on aircraft surfaces to help prevent icing problems
 Denver boot, also known as a wheel clamp, which can be attached to a vehicle to prevent its movement

Other uses 
 Boot (medical), a protective device worn while an injured foot is healing
 Boot (real estate), any property received by a taxpayer in an IRC 1031 exchange which is not like-kind to the relinquished property
 Boot (torture), a torture device for crushing the human foot
 Boot of beer, a form of beer glassware in the shape of a boot
 Build-Operate-Own-Transfer, an arrangement for funding projects
 Cylinder boot, a rubber protector for the bottom end of a scuba cylinder
 Boot, Old English for estover, an English law term
 Boot, the outer shell of a reed pipe in a pipe organ

See also 
 Bhoot (disambiguation)
 "Booted" (song), a 1952 R&B song by Roscoe Gordon
 Boötes, a constellation of stars
 "Boots, Boots, Boots", an episode of the British TV series Dad's Army
 Boots! Boots!, a 1934 British comedy film
 Caligula (12–41), nickname (Latin for "little [soldier's] boot") of Roman emperor Gaius Julius Caesar Augustus Germanicus